The Vereinsthaler was the currency of the Kingdom of Hanover between 1857 and 1866. The Vereinsthaler replaced the prior Thaler at par.  The Vereinsthaler was first subdivided into 24 Groschen, each of 12 Pfennig, thus 288 Pfennig = 1 Vereinsthaler. From 1858 on the subdivisions were more decimalised to 30 Groschen, each of 10 Pfennig, thus 300 Pfennig making up a Vereinsthaler.

When in 1866 the Kingdom of Prussia annexed Hanover the Hanoveran currency was replaced by the Prussian Vereinsthaler, subdivided into 30 Silbergroschen, each of 12 Pfennig (thus 360 Pfennig = 1 Pr. Vereinsthaler).

Currencies of Germany
Modern obsolete currencies
Kingdom of Hanover
1857 establishments in the Kingdom of Hanover
1866 disestablishments in the Kingdom of Hanover
19th-century economic history
1860s in Germany